Jupitora Bhuyan is an Indian actress works in the Assamese films. She worked in a few Assamese films along with VCD films and telefilms. She is also part of Assamese mobile theatre industry debut by playing lead female roles in Kohinoor Theatre. She is especially known for playing extraordinary character with a powerful appearance.

Early life
Jupitora was born in Guwahati, the capital city of Assam. She did her schooling at Tarini Charan Girls School in Guwahati and later joined Handique Girls College to study arts.

Career
In an interview, she said that she made her acting debut through a comminsoned program in Doordarshan Guwahati at around 2003.

Bhuyan joined the Assamese film industry in the year 2005 with Sibanan Baruah's movie Hiyar Dapunot Tumare Sobi with Ravi Sarma and Barsha Rani Bishaya. She has also acted in various VCD films like Unmona Mon, Jon Tora etc.

Tumi Jodi Kuwa
() is an Assamese musical, romantic drama film directed, dialogue and scriptwritten by Simple Gogoi and produced by Teron Jitumoni under the banner of L.N. Films. Cast list of the film are Prasenjit Borah, Bhuyan, Munmi Kalita, Rupam Sharma, Prince, Bhaskar Ranjan, Ranjan Dutta, Krishna. The makeup is done by Akash Gogoi, Subhash and Vijayeta. The film's story is given by Gautam Rabha. The film was released on 14 June 2013.

Ajeyo
() is a 2014 Assamese language drama film directed by Jahnu Barua; based on the Sahitya Akademi Award winner 1997 Assamese novel Ashirbador Rong written by Arun Sharma and adapted as screenplay by the director himself. It was produced by Shankar Lal Goenka and stars Rupam Chetia and Jupitora Bhuyan in the lead roles. The film was released on 3 January 2014.

Ajeyo depicts the struggles of an honest, ideal revolutionary youth Gajen Keot who fought against the social evils in rural Assam during the freedom movement in India. She played a Muslim character in the movie.

Mobile Theater
Bhuyan played lead female roles in Kohinoor Theatre against Jatin Bora in 2008. Later she has been part of various mobile theatre groups like Rajashree Theatre, Chiranjeeb Theatre, Rajtilak Theatre etc.

Filmography
Film

Television

Meghranjani

Pratigya

Chameli Memsaab

Akaxor Thikona Bisari

Sahu Buwari (episodic)

Sinaki Xuhuri (episodic)

Nibir Mayare

Awards and nominations

References

External links
 
 

Indian film actresses
Actresses in Assamese cinema
Living people
Actresses from Guwahati
21st-century Indian actresses
Year of birth missing (living people)